The 35th TCA Awards were held on August 3, 2019, in a ceremony hosted by Desus and Mero at The Beverly Hilton in Beverly Hills, California. The nominees were announced by the Television Critics Association on June 19, 2019.

Winners and nominees

Shows with multiple nominations

The following shows received multiple nominations:

Shows with multiple wins

References

External links
 Official website

2019 television awards
2019 in American television
TCA Awards ceremonies